Federation is a collection of short stories by American writer H. Beam Piper, edited by John F. Carr. The book was published in 1981 by Ace Books, and again in 1982, 1983 and 1986. Most of these stories take place in the early part of his Terro-Human Future History.

Contents
 Essay: “Piper's Foundation” by Jerry Pournelle
 Introduction by John F. Carr.
 "Omnilingual (first appeared in Astounding Science Fiction, February 1957)
 "Naudsonce" (First appeared in Analog, January 1962)
 "Oomphel in the Sky" (first appeared in Analog, November 1960)
 "Graveyard of Dreams" (first appeared in Galaxy Science Fiction. February 1958)
 "When in the Course" (previously unpublished)

References

Awards
 1982 — Locus Poll Award, Best Single Author Collection

1981 short story collections
Science fiction short story collections
Ace Books books
Works by H. Beam Piper